Chwee kueh, also spelt chwee kwee or chwee kweh, is a type of steamed rice cake originating in Teochew cuisine that is served with preserved radish.

History
During the 19th century, many Teochew people moved to Singapore, bringing their culinary expertise with them. Today, chee kueh is a popular breakfast item in Singapore, served in many of its hawker centres and it is commonly associated with Singaporean cuisine.

To make chwee kueh, rice flour and water are mixed together to form a slightly viscous mixture. The mixture is then poured into small saucer-like aluminium cups and steamed, forming a characteristic bowl-like shape when cooked. The rice cakes are almost tasteless on their own, but are topped with diced preserved radish and served with chilli sauce.

See also

Idli
 List of steamed foods
Rice cake

Notes

References

Singaporean cuisine
Singaporean rice dishes
Steamed foods
Teochew cuisine
Rice cakes